René Pape (born 4 September 1964) is a German operatic bass. Pape has received two Grammys, was named "Vocalist of the Year" by Musical America in 2002, "Artist of the Year" by the German opera critics in 2006, and won an ECHO award (the German equivalent of the Grammy) in 2009.

Life and career
René Pape was born in Dresden, then part of East Germany. His mother is a hairdresser and his father a chef. His parents divorced when he was two years old and he sometimes lived with his grandmother, who opened the way for his interest in music. His maternal grandfather was an operetta tenor.

Pape received his musical education from 1974 to 1981 with Dresdner Kreuzchor (he even appeared as one of the Three Boys in Die Zauberflöte) and the Dresden Conservatory in the early '80s. He had his debut with the Berlin Staatsoper Unter den Linden in 1988, and achieved international recognition in 1991, when Sir Georg Solti cast him as Sarastro in a production of Die Zauberflöte, a role he sang again the same year at La Scala in Milan under Solti's direction. He sang in Haydn's Die Jahreszeiten with the Orchestre de Paris and the Chicago Symphony Orchestra, both under Solti (1992), then Don Fernando in Beethoven's Fidelio, the Speaker and Sarastro with the Vienna State Opera during the 1992–93 season, King Philip in Verdi's Don Carlo in Basle, Switzerland. He made his debut at the Bayreuth Festival as Fasolt in Das Rheingold in 1994, conducted by James Levine. He first performed at the Metropolitan Opera in New York City as the Night Watchman in Wagner's Die Meistersinger von Nürnberg, where he has performed practically every year since, as Fasolt, King of Egypt in Verdi's Aida in 1997, the Old Hebrew in Samson et Dalila by Saint-Saëns in 1998, King Marke in Wagner's Tristan und Isolde in 1999, Escamillo in Bizet's Carmen and Rocco in Fidelio in 2000, Orest in Elektra by Richard Strauss in 2002, Gurnemanz i Wagner's Parsifal in 2003, Leporello in Don Giovanni and King Marke in 2004, Méphistophélès in Gounod's Faust in 2005, King Heinrich, King Philip, and Sarastro in 2006, Banquo in Verdi's Macbeth in 2008, Fasolt, Hunding in Wagner's Die Walküre in 2009, and the title role of Mussorgsky's Boris Godunov in 2010. About his role as King Marke, Anthony Tommasini wrote in The New York Times on 30 November 2008: "Few singers have conveyed Marke's feelings of betrayal by his beloved nephew Tristan with such lofty, noble anguish". "René Pape's King Marke is a magnificent and dignified performance, sung with the utmost compassion and with an enviable richness and range of bass tone", wrote Michael Kennedy in the Sunday Telegraph on 25 May 2003. "As Heinrich, René Pape displayed what must be the most sumptuous operatic bass in the world", wrote Rupert Christiansen in the Daily Telegraph on 5 June 2003.

Pape was honored on 27 October 2010 by the Metropolitan Opera Guild as part of its Met Mastersingers series. In addition to the Metropolitan Opera, Pape sings often with the Lyric Opera of Chicago, with Thielemann as Pogner, as Rocco in 2005 and Faust in 2009. He had his first solo recital in Carnegie Hall on 25 April 2009, where he sang German lieder by Schubert, Hugo Wolf and Schumann.

Pape made his debut at London's Royal Opera House as King Heinrich in Wagner's Lohengrin in 1997; and at the Paris Opéra under James Conlon as King Marke in 1998.

Pape made a highly acclaimed debut as Wotan in Wagner's Der Ring des Nibelungen in 2011 in a new co-production by the Staatsoper Berlin, directed by the Belgian Guy Cassiers, with Daniel Barenboim conducting. His rendition of Wotan, both virile and lyrical, was very compelling, with all the dilemma he faces and his human frailty.

Pape made his film debut as Sarastro in Kenneth Branagh's The Magic Flute, which premiered simultaneously at the 2006 Toronto International Film Festival and the 2006 Venice Film Festival. He has also performed in Hunter's Bride, a film version of Weber's Der Freischütz, released in 2010, by film director Jens Neubert, in which he sang the role of the Hermit.

Pape is also known for his performances of the song cycle Mein Herz brennt, composed by Torsten Rasch and based on the music of the heavy metal band Rammstein. In 2007, he released the Rammstein-Song "Mann gegen Mann" by the German band Rammstein in a piano version by German composer Sven Helbig.

Pape has received two Grammys for his recordings (Die Meistersinger in 1997 and Tannhäuser in 2002), was named "Vocalist of the Year" by Musical America in 2002, "Artist of the Year" by the German opera critics in 2006 for his Boris Godunov at the Berlin Staatsoper, and won in 2009 an ECHO award for his solo arias, Gods, Kings and Demons.

Pape performed in Beethoven's Ninth Symphony at the BBC Proms in 2012. He was awarded the title of an Austrian Kammersänger in 2018.

In 2017 and 2018, he appeared as King Marke in Tristan and Isolde at the Bayreuth Festival, but has no plans to return there.
 In 2019, he appeared as King Philip in Don Carlo in Paris. In 2021, and 2022 he appeared as Boris Godunov at the Metropolitan Opera.

Controversy
In July 2022, Pape was the centre of a social media scandal, following a Facebook comment by the Metropolitan Opera Chorus celebrating the New York City Pride Parade, Pape responded that he will not return to the institution, and included the sentence "I feel sorry for this wonderful city!" Pape published an apology next day.

In his statement, Pape both apologised for the comments and confirmed public speculation about his struggles with alcoholism. Pape stated that in his original comment “[he] was attempting to make a statement about what [he] feel[s] are sometimes performative actions by opera houses“. He admitted that “instead [he] wrote poorly written comments that seemed filled with hate for a community which has loved and supported [him] for years”.

Discography 
 Mozart: Requiem, Mar. 1992, Vienna Philharmonic conducted by Georg Solti, Decca
 Korngold: Das Wunder der Heliane, Apr. 1993, Berliner Rundfunk-Sinfonie-Orchester conducted by John Mauceri, Decca
 Mendelssohn: Die erste Walpurgisnacht, Nov. 1993, Chamber Orchestra of Europe conducted by Nikolaus Harnoncourt, Teldec
 Busoni:  Turandot, Oct. 1993, Berliner Rundfunk-Sinfonie-Orchester conducted by Gerd Albrecht, Capriccio
 Wagner: Die Meistersinger von Nürnberg, Sep. 1994, Bayerischen Staatsoper conducted by Wolfgang Sawallisch, EMI Classics
 Mendelssohn: Antigone, Jan. 1995, Berliner Rundfunk-Sinfonie-Orchester conducted by Stefan Soltesz, Capriccio
 Haydn: Die Schöpfung, Feb. 1995, Chicago Symphony Orchestra conducted by Georg Solti, Decca
 Busoni: Arlecchino, Mar. 1995, Berliner Rundfunk-Sinfonie-Orchester conducted by Gerd Albrecht, Capriccio
 Beethoven: Missa solemnis, Jun. 1995,  Berlin Philharmonic conducted by Georg Solti, Decca
 Beethoven: Choral Fantasy/Triple Concerto, Nov. 1995, Berlin Philharmonic conducted by Daniel Barenboim, EMI Classics
 Mendelssohn: Oedipus, Jan. 1996, Berliner Rundfunk-Sinfonie-Orchester conducted by Stefan Soltesz, Capriccio
 Wagner: Die Meistersinger von Nürnberg, Feb. 1997, Chicago Symphony Orchestra conducted by Georg Solti, Decca
 Mahler: Symphony No. 8, Mar. 1997, Bavarian Radio Symphony Orchestra conducted by Colin Davis, RCA
 Franz Schmidt: The Book with Seven Seals, Oct. 1998, Bavarian Radio Symphony Orchestra conducted by Franz Welser-Möst, EMI Classics
 Wagner: Lohengrin, Nov. 1998, Staatskapelle Berlin conducted by Daniel Barenboim, Teldec Classics
 Beethoven: Symphony No. 9, Dec. 2000, Staatskapelle Berlin conducted by Daniel Barenboim, Teldec Classics
 Beethoven: Fidelio, Jan. 2000, Staatskapelle Berlin conducted by Daniel Barenboim, Teldec Classics
 Wagner: Tannhäuser, 2001, Staatskapelle Berlin conducted by Daniel Barenboim, Teldec Classics
 Torsten Rasch: Mein Herz brennt, 2003. Dresdner Sinfoniker conducted by John Carewe, Universal Music/Deutsche Grammophon
 Rammstein: Reise, Reise, 2004, Motor/Republic
 10th Annual Opera Gala in support of the German AIDS Foundation, May 2004, Deutsche Oper Berlin conducted by Kent Nagano, RCA
 Mozart: Bastien und Bastienne, Sep. 2005, Rundfunk-Sinfonie-Orchester Leipzig conducted by Max Pommer, Berlin Classics
 Wagner: Tristan und Isolde, Sep. 2005, Royal Opera House Covent Garden conducted by Antonio Pappano, EMI Classics
 Rammstein: Rosenrot, Oct. 2005, Universal
 Mozart: Das Mozart Album, Jul. 2006, Mahler Chamber Orchestra conducted by Claudio Abbado, Deutsche Grammophon
 Beethoven: Symphony No. 9, Oct. 2007, Cleveland Orchestra conducted by Franz Welser-Möst, Deutsche Grammophon
 Mozart: The Magic Flute, May. 2007, Mahler Chamber Orchestra conducted by Claudio Abbado, Deutsche Grammophon
 Gods, Kings & Demons, Aug. 2008, Staatskapelle Dresden conducted by Sebastian Weigle, Deutsche Grammophon
Weber: Hunter's Bride (Der Freischütz), 2009, London Symphony Orchestra conducted by Daniel Harding, Constantin Film
 Wagner: Parsifal, September 2010, Mariinsky Theatre Orchestra and Chorus conducted by Valery Gergiev, Mariinsky
 Wagner: arias from Walküre, Die Meistersinger von Nürnberg, Lohengrin, Parsifal, Tannhäuser Staatskapelle Berlin, cond. Daniel Barenboim DGG, 2010

References

Sources
Louise T. Guinther, Cover Feature: René Pape, Opera News, January 2007

External links
  
 Rayfield Allied profile
 René Pape: Career, roles, performances, CDs and DVDs

1964 births
Living people
Grammy Award winners
Österreichischer Kammersänger
German operatic basses
20th-century German male opera singers
21st-century German male opera singers
Musicians from Dresden